Brookwood Baptist Health is a network of hospitals, outpatient centers and clinics headquartered in Birmingham, Alabama. It is owned by Dallas-based Tenet Healthcare. The system is the result of a merger between Brookwood Medical Center and Baptist Health System.

As Baptist Health System
Baptist Health System was founded in 1922 by the Birmingham Baptist Association. The nonprofit organization's first hospital was Birmingham Baptist Hospital, now known as Princeton Baptist Medical Center. The hospital merged with Montclair Hospital to form Baptist Health System. It was one of the largest healthcare providers in Alabama since the 1950s through the mid-2000s. Economic factors required the system to sell many of its small properties and ultimately forced the system to sell a majority stake of Montclair Baptist Medical Center to Plano, Texas-based Triad Hospitals. The majority stake was spun-off again in 2008 to Community Health Systems of Brentwood, Tennessee, and the property was renamed Trinity Medical Center. Trinity eventually closed the Montclair location after purchasing and renovating the unfinished Healthsouth Digital Hospital, now called Grandview Medical Center in Birmingham.

Brookwood Medical Center merger
In late 2014, Tenet Healthcare announced it was interested in merging its 600-bed acute care hospital in Birmingham, Brookwood Medical Center, with Baptist Health System. On October 2, 2015, Tenet announced it had finalized the merger. The combined system has more than 1,700 beds across its five acute care hospitals and employs more than 7,000 people. The new system was renamed Brookwood Baptist Health, and unveiled a new logo in 2016.

Acute Care Properties

References

Tenet Healthcare
Companies based in Birmingham, Alabama
Medical and health organizations based in Alabama